The Cindrel Natural Park is a protected area (natural park category V IUCN) situated in Romania, on the administrative territory of Sibiu County.

See also 
 Dumbrava Sibiului Natural Park
 Protected areas of Romania

References 

Protected areas of Romania
Geography of Sibiu County
Protected areas established in 2000
Tourist attractions in Sibiu County